Antarctoneptunea aurora is a species of sea snail, a marine gastropod mollusk in the family Buccinidae, the true whelks.

Description
Antarctoneptunea aurora is a small to medium-sized buccinid whelk species.

Distribution
Antarctoneptunea aurora occurs in the Southern Ocean surrounding Antarctica, particularly from the Ross Sea. Specimens have been collected from depths between 188 and 603 metres.

References

External links
 Museum of New Zealand Te Papa Tongarewa, Taxon: Antarctoneptunea aurora (Hedley, 1916) (Species)

Buccinidae
Molluscs described in 1916